The following is the final results of the Iran Super League 2008/09 basketball season, Persian Gulf Cup.

Regular season

Standings

 In April 2009 Saba Mehr transferred from Tehran to Qazvin.

Results

Relegation

Playoffs

Final standings

References
 Asia Basket
 Iranian Basketball Federation

Iranian Basketball Super League seasons
League
Iran